The New York Young Republican Club (NYYRC) is an organization for members of the Republican Party between the ages of 18 and 40 in New York City. The New York Young Republican Club is the oldest and largest chapter in the United States, founded in 1911 with predecessor organizations going back to 1856. The club is affiliated with and officially recognized by the New York State Young Republicans and the Young Republican National Federation, as well as the county, state, and national Republican committees.

New York City Republican organizations were once a bastion of moderate Republicans with liberal or centrist views on social issues, but since the election of Donald Trump have moved sharply to the political right.

History

Founding
In April 1911, thirty-two young men, led by a young Manhattan lawyer Benjamin M. Day, along with, Philip J. McCook, Lloyd Carpenter Griscom, Frederick Paul Keppel, Henry W. Goddard, Edward R. Finch, Alfred Conkling Coxe Jr., Lindon Bates Jr., Thomas D. Thacher, Albert S. Bard, and Robert McC. Marsh, formed the New York Young Republican Club. This was an offshoot of the earlier New York Young Men's Republican Club, founded in 1879 amid the rise of political clubs, which itself was a descendant of the even earlier New York Young Men's Republican Union founded in 1856.

The club's first public appearance was a dinner held in December 1911. The guest of honor was the President of the United States, William Howard Taft, and the principal speaker was Idaho Senator William Borah.

In 1930, the New York Young Republican Club circulated a questionnaire to its members; of the 649 responses, an overwhelming number (424) supported the repeal of the Eighteenth Amendment (which prohibited alcohol), 117 favored modification of the Volstead Act, and only 108 favored enforcement of prohibition.

Dewey administration
The New York Young Republican Club was significant to the political network of Governor Thomas Dewey. Club members were important parts of Dewey's campaigns for governor and president, and in 1952 and 1956, Dewey used the club to promote the presidential campaigns of Dwight D. Eisenhower. In the 1950s, John V. Lindsay, later mayor of New York City, joined the organization, which was an all-male group at the time. He became vice president of the group in 1951 and (after Eisenhower's win in 1952, became president of the group). During his presidency of the group, Lindsay was involved in an acrimonious internal battle between a faction led by Charles Miller Metzner (to whom Lindsay belonged) and a rival faction led by F. Clifton White and William A. Rusher.

1964 elections
In 1964, the New York Times described the club as "not a large one" but "old and influential in Young Republican affairs." That year, the club was described as having 1,200 members citywide.

Amid the 1964 Republican presidential contest between New York's Republican Governor Nelson Rockefeller and Arizona Senator Barry Goldwater, a pro-Rockefeller faction won the club's presidency by a vote of 365–202 over an independent candidate running with conservative support. The group endorsed Rockeller's campaign for the Republican presidential nomination by a 184–6 vote, and endorsed, by a 187–1 vote, the re-nomination of state Senator MacNeil Mitchell, who was facing an insurgent primary challenge from Jacob Javits's nephew Eric Javits. The same year, the Club supported John V. Lindsay's decision to run for re-election as mayor as an independent Republican; the group broke from the leaders of other Young Republican clubs in the city, such as those of City College, New York University, Columbia College, and Fordham University, as well as the Young Women's Republican Club of New York, all of whom condemned Lindsay's decision.

Since 2016
After the rise of Donald Trump, the city's Republican groups moved decidedly to the right. In December 2020, amid the COVID-19 pandemic, the New York Young Republican Club hosted a gala in Jersey City, New Jersey where the participants flouted public health guidelines. Dozens gathered in crowds indoors, did not wear masks, and did not socially distance. Matt Gaetz, a Republican congressman from Florida, and James O’Keefe, a right-wing activist, attended the party. New Jersey's Democratic Governor Phil Murphy criticized it.

The club endorsed the re-election of Brazilian president Jair Bolsonaro in the 2022 Brazilian presidential election. When Bolsonaro narrowly lost, the club accused Brazilian left-wing parties of mass voter fraud (without offering any evidence in support of this assertion); claimed that Bolsonaro was the rightful winner; and endorsed a military coup to keep Bolsonaro in power.

In December 2022, the club held a gala event in Manhattan that featured both Republican politicians and far-right extremists.Jonathan Weisman, A New York Gala Draws Incoming G.O.P. Lawmakers, and Extremists, New York Times (December 14, 2022). At the event, Republican congresswoman Marjorie Taylor Greene told attendees that if she and former Trump advisor Stephen K. Bannon had organized the January 6 United States Capitol attack, "we would have won" and "it would have been armed." Given top billing for the gala were Taylor Greene, Jack Posobiec (a far-right conspiracy theorist who pushed Pizzagate conspiracy theories), and Donald Trump Jr.; featured as "special guests" were three newly elected incoming Republican House members—George Santos of New York, Cory Mills of Florida, and Mike Collins of Georgia. Also attending the event were Newsweek opinion editor Josh Hammer,  Peter Brimelow, an anti-immigrant activist whose VDARE website publishes the work of white nationalists, and members of the Freedom Party of Austria and Alternative for Germany, two extreme-right European parties with an authoritarian heritage.

See also 
 Young Republicans
 College Republicans
 Teen Age Republicans
 Republicans Overseas
 Republican National Committee
 New York Republican State Committee

References

External links 
 

Republican Party (United States) organizations
International Young Democrat Union
Youth wings of conservative parties
Young Republican National Federation